Cleistoblechnum is a genus of ferns in the family Blechnaceae, subfamily Blechnoideae, with a single species Cleistoblechnum eburneum, according to the Pteridophyte Phylogeny Group classification of 2016 (PPG I). The genus is accepted in a 2016 classification of the family Blechnaceae, but other sources sink it into a very broadly defined Blechnum, equivalent to the whole of the PPG I subfamily.

The natural habitat of Cleistoblechnum eburneum is subtropical or tropical moist lowland forests. It is threatened by habitat loss. It is native to China and Taiwan.

References

Blechnaceae
Monotypic fern genera
Taxobox binomials not recognized by IUCN